Rafał Leszczyński (born 26 April 1992) is a Polish professional footballer who plays as a goalkeeper for Ekstraklasa side Śląsk Wrocław.

External links

References

Living people
1992 births
Polish footballers
Poland international footballers
Association football goalkeepers
Ząbkovia Ząbki players
Piast Gliwice players
Podbeskidzie Bielsko-Biała players
Chrobry Głogów players
Śląsk Wrocław players
Ekstraklasa players
I liga players
II liga players
Footballers from Warsaw
Poland youth international footballers
Poland under-21 international footballers